Mount Gardner is a mountain,  high, standing  west of Mount Tyree in the west-central part of the Sentinel Range, in the Ellsworth Mountains of Antarctica. It surmounts Patton Glacier to the northeast.

The peak was discovered by the Marie Byrd Land Traverse party of 1957–58 under Charles R. Bentley and was named by the Advisory Committee on Antarctic Names for Lieutenant Harvey E. Gardner, U.S. Navy, a pilot in Antarctica in the 1957–58 and 1958–59 seasons who was killed in the crash of a UB-1 Otter airplane at Marble Point on January 4, 1959.

See also
 Mountains in Antarctica

Maps
 Vinson Massif.  Scale 1:250 000 topographic map.  Reston, Virginia: US Geological Survey, 1988.
 Antarctic Digital Database (ADD). Scale 1:250000 topographic map of Antarctica. Scientific Committee on Antarctic Research (SCAR). Since 1993, regularly upgraded and updated.

References

Ellsworth Mountains
Mountains of Ellsworth Land
Four-thousanders of Antarctica